The Evetta is a small Isetta-inspired electric car to be produced by the German company Electric Brands. It was presented for the first time at the 2022 International Motor Show Germany.

History
The vehicle was first introduced by Artega in 2019 and was called the Karo, but in 2022 it was acquired by the German company Electric Brands, the same company that introduced the Xbus electric truck in 2021.

Overview

Electric Brands aims to start delivering the Evetta by the summer of 2023, priced at €19,540 including German taxes.

See also
 Microlino, another Isetta-inspired electric vehicle

References

External links
 Official website

Battery electric vehicles